Kirill Yuryevich Krolevets (born 7 October 1986) is a Russian former professional football player.

Club career
He played two seasons in the Russian Football National League for FC Irtysh Omsk and FC Khimki.

External links
 
 

1986 births
Living people
Russian footballers
Association football midfielders
FC Irtysh Omsk players
FC Khimki players
FC Tekstilshchik Ivanovo players